Northbrook may refer to:

Places

Settlements
Northbrook, Illinois, United States
Northbrook, Ohio, United States
Northbrook, Oxfordshire, a hamlet near the village of, and within the parish of, Kirtlington, Oxfordshire, United Kingdom
Northbrook, Wiltshire, a hamlet near the village of, and within the parish of, Market Lavington, Wiltshire, United Kingdom
Northbrook, Hampshire, a place near Micheldever, Hampshire, United Kingdom
Northbrook (electoral division), a West Sussex County Council constituency, United Kingdom
Northbrook, Ontario, a place in Addington Highlands, Ontario Canada
Northbrook, Frederickton, Newfoundland and Labrador a place near Frederickton, Newfoundland and Labrador, Canada

Northbrook Park
Northbrook Park, Farnham, Surrey, a historic house and grounds built in 1810, now a wedding venue in Farnham, Surrey, United Kingdom
Northbrook Park, London, a 9-acre public park in Grove Park, London Borough of Lewisham, United Kingdom, opened in 1903
Northbrook Park, Devon, a park, estate and golf course in Exeter, Devon, United Kingdom
Northbrook Park District, a district and organisation founded in 1927 which manages parks and recreation in Northbrook, Illinois, United States

Education
Northbrook High School a high School in Spring Branch, Houston, Texas, United States
Northbrook Metropolitan College a former higher education college with campuses in Worthing and Shoreham-by-Sea, West Sussex, United Kingdom
Northbrooks Secondary School, a co-educational government secondary school in Yishun, Singapore

Other
Northbrook Island, Russia
Northbrook (river), a river, in Exeter, Devon, United Kingdom, tributary of the River Exe
Northbrook (Metra) a railway station in Northbrook, Illinois, United States
Northbrook Court, a shopping mall in Northbrook, Illinois, United States

Other uses
Baron Northbrook, several people
The Virgin and Child (The Northbrook Madonna)
Northbrook Technology, now Allstate Northern Ireland, a Northern Irish technology company